Arson, Inc. is a 1949 American film noir directed by William Berke. It is also known as Firebug Squad and Three Alarm Fire.

Plot

Joe Martin is a fire fighter in Los Angeles who is assigned by his department chief to the Arson Detail. His first assignment is to investigate a suspicious fur store fire that seems to be set by the store owner himself, Thomas Peyson.

The reason why Joe Martin gets the assignment is because his predecessor in the Arson Detail was killed when inspecting the very same fire site. The predecessor's file with his findings wasn't found on his body and hasn't been recovered. This is just one of many equally suspicious fires in the last few years, where the insurance claims following the fires has been filed by the same agent, Frederick P. Fender. There is suspicion that Fender is somehow involved in the disappearance of all the destroyed stores' goods as well.

Joe begins with Peyson, the store owner, and visits his apartment that was also raged by fire not long ago. He meets the babysitter, Jane, a pretty young teacher, and they get along so well that Joe drives her home and ask her out on a date the next evening.

It turns out Peyson and Fender is in cahoots together, since the first thing Peyson does after Joe leaves, is phone his accomplice. They also meet up the day after, just when Joe comes to see Fender as the next logical step in his investigation. Joe never sees Peyson, as he sneaks out through a back door. Joe gets very little information of use from Fender, but his visit makes Fender put one of his men, Pete, on tailing Joe to see if he finds out something.

Pete starts following Joe around everywhere he goes, even when he visits Jane. Soon Joe realizes that he is followed and when he knowingly enters an illegal gambling place Pete finally makes contact, offering Joe a chance of making a little extra money. Joe decides to play along and go "undercover".

When visiting an illegal bookie, Joe starts to fight a policeman and the next day a picture showing him hitting a police officer is on the tabloids. He gets fired for this highly unfitting behavior, and Pete makes contact again, wanting to use the ex-fireman in the insurance fraud racket. Joe and Jane both meets Fender at a party held at Pete's, and Fender is smitten with the young teacher. Fender's secretary Betty sees this, and feels her own agenda is threatened.

Joe is hired to do some work for Fender, and the following day he is to drive a car for Pete when he is doing a "job", setting fire to another store. Joe's job is to block the way for the fire trucks coming to put the fire out. Pete also jams the water sprinklers inside the store.

Joe shares the plan with an undercover policeman, Murph, and after the fire is set, the cop steps in and single-handedly extinguishes the fire before it grows out of control. All the store goods are already removed from the store by Pete. But Pete returns to the store to see that the fire is destroying the store completely, and he finds Murph at the scene. Pete shoots Murph, but more police arrive to the store, and a car chase ensues, where Jie and Pete ultimately manage to shake the police.

Fender realizes the police was warned and suspects his secretary Betty, who has been behaving strangely. Fender orders her towatch Pete by dating him, and so they go on a double date with Jie and Jane that night, at the Gaucho Club. Joe tells Jane about his undercover assignment on the way to the club.

When Betty gets drunk she accidentally discloses the address where the furs are stored and after the dinner, Joe and Jane go there. Joe is unaware that Betty was ordered by Fender to slip the address to trap Joe.

Joe drives the drunk Pete home and manages to find the file from the fireman investigator in Pete's apartment. He takes Jane with him and return to the warehouse where the furs are, alerting the police on the way. Meanwhile, Pete wakes up again and discovers what has happened.

When Joe and the police arrive at the warehouse there are no furs in it. The police look at the file Joe brought and they find evidence implicating Pete as involved in setting the fire. The police leave to arrest Pete, but Pete arrives to the warehouse with a gun and points it towards Jane. Fender is alerted of the situation by a night watchman and tries to get there as fast as he can, driving in his car with Betty by his side.

Joe manages to take the gun from Pete, but Pete gets the gun from the night watchman and pursues Joe and Jane as they try to escape. Pete sets fire to the warehouse, trying to trap Joe and Jane inside. Fire trucks get the alarm and comes to the warehouse, and Fender crashes his car on the way, driving too fast. With the help of the firemen, Joe catches Pete and overpowers him, and the rest of the villains are caught. After the big intermezzo at the warehouse, Joe and Jane continue dating each other.

Cast 
 Robert Lowery as Joe Martin
 Anne Gwynne as Jane Jennings
 Edward Brophy as Pete Purdy
 Marcia Mae Jones as Betty – Fender's Secretary
 Douglas Fowley as Frederick P. 'Fred' Fender
 Maude Eburne as Grandma
 William Forrest as Deputy Fire Chief / Narrator
 Steve Pendleton as Murph, the undercover man
 Byron Foulger as Thomas Peyson
 Matt McHugh as Hubbell
 Lelah Tyler as Mrs. Peyson
 Emmett Vogan as Al, Night Watchman
 John Maxwell as Detective
 Richard David as Junior Peyson

Production
Filming began March 10, 1949. Location footage was shot in San Francisco.

Actor George Reeves did some dialogue directing on the film. (Reeves ad directed in theatre).

Reception
The Los Angeles Times called the film "lively".

References

External links 
 
 
 Arson Inc at BFI
 

1949 films
American crime films
1949 crime films
1940s English-language films
American black-and-white films
Films directed by William A. Berke
Lippert Pictures films
Films scored by Raoul Kraushaar
1940s American films